Phanera is a genus of flowering plants in the legume subfamily Cercidoideae and the tribe Bauhinieae.  This genus differs from Bauhinia in being vines or lianas, generally with tendrils and a lobed rather than spathaceous calyx, and from Schnella in having only three fertile stamens rather than ten, and being native to the Indomalayan realm and the Australasian realm rather than the Americas. The subsection Corymbosae was recently segregated into a new genus, Cheniella. It has been suggested that the genus Lasiobema should be reduced to a section within Phanera.

Species

Phanera comprises the following species:

 Phanera aherniana (Perkins) de Wit
 var. aherniana (Perkins) de Wit
 var. subglabra (Merr.) Bandyop., P.P. Goshal & M.K. Pathak

 Phanera andersonii (K. Larsen & S.S. Larsen) Bandyop., P.P. Goshal & M.K. Pathak

 Phanera apertilobata (Merr. & F.P.Metcalf) K.W.Jiang
 Phanera argentea de Wit
 Phanera audax de Wit
 Phanera aurea (H. Lév.) Mackinder & R. Clark
 Phanera aureifolia (K. Larsen & S.S. Larsen) Bandyop., P.P. Goshal & M.K. Pathak—Gold Leaf Bauhinia

 Phanera bassacensis (Pierre ex Gagnep.) de Wit
 var. backeri de Wit
 var. bassacensis (Pierre ex Gagnep.) de Wit

 Phanera bracteata Benth.
 subsp. astylosa (K. Larsen & S.S. Larsen) Bandyop., P.P. Ghoshal & M.K. Pathak
 subsp. bracteata Graham ex Benth.
 Phanera bidentata (Jack) Benth.—Orange Bauhinia
 var. bidentata (Jack) Benth.
 var. breviflora (Ridl.) K. Larsen & S.S. Larsen
 var. cornifolia (Baker)Benn.
 var. fraseri (de Wit) K. Larsen & S.S. Larsen
 var. gracilipes (Merr.) K. Larsen & S.S. Larsen
 var. monticola (Ridl.) Bandyop., P.P. Ghoshal & M.K. Pathak

 Phanera brevipedicellata (Jarvie) Mackinder & R. Clark
 Phanera burbidgei (Stapf) Bandyop., P.P. Ghoshal & M.K. Pathak

 Phanera calciphylla (D.X. Zhang & T.C. Chen) Mackinder & R. Clark
 Phanera campanulata (S.S. Larsen) Bandyop., P.P. Ghoshal & M.K. Pathak
 Phanera carcinophylla (Merr.) Mackinder & R. Clark
 Phanera cardinalis (Pierre ex Gagnep.) Sinou & Bruneau

 Phanera cercidifolia (D.X.Zhang) K.W.Jiang
 Phanera chalcophylla (H.Y.Chen) Mackinder & R.Clark
 Phanera championii Benth.
 Phanera coccinea Lour.
 Phanera comosa (Craib) Bandyop. & Ghoshal
 Phanera concreta (Craib) Sinou & Bruneau

 Phanera crudiantha de Wit

 Phanera cuprea (Ridl.) de Wit

 Phanera curtisii (Prain) Bandyop. & Ghoshal

 Phanera decumbens (Henderson) de Wit
 Phanera diphylla (Buch.-Ham.) Benth. in Miq.

 Phanera divergens (Baker) Thoth.

 Phanera elmeri (Merr.) de Wit

 Phanera erythropoda (Hayata) Mackinder & R. Clark
 var. erythropoda (Hayata) Mackinder & R. Clark
 var. guangxiensis (D.X. Zhang & T.C. Chen) Mackinder & R. Clark
 Phanera excelsa Miq.
 var. aurora de Wit
 var. excelsa Miq.

 Phanera excurrens (Stapf) Bandyop., P.P. Ghoshal & M.K. Pathak
 Phanera fabrilis (de Wit) Bandyop., P.P. Ghoshal & M.K. Pathak
 Phanera ferruginea (Roxb.) Benth.
 var. ferruginea (Roxb.) Benth.
 var. griffithiana (Benth.) Bandyop., P.P. Ghoshal & M.K. Pathak
 Phanera finlaysoniana Benth.
 var. amoena de Wit
 var. finlaysoniana Benth.

 var. leptopus (Perkins) K. Larsen & S.S. Larsen
 var. montana de Wit

 Phanera flava (de Wit) Bandyop. & Ghoshal
 Phanera foraminifera (Gagnep.) de Wit

 Phanera franckii (K. Larsen & S.S. Larsen) Bandyop., P.P. Ghoshal & M.K. Pathak
 Phanera fulva (Korth.) Benth.

 Phanera glabrifolia Benth.
 var. glabrifolia Benth.
 var. maritima (K. Larsen & S.S. Larsen) Bandyop.
 var. sericea (Lace) Bandyop.
 Phanera glabristipes de Wit

 Phanera gracillima de Wit

 Phanera harmsiana (Hosseus) Bandyop. & Ghoshal
 Phanera hekouensis (T.Y.Tu & D.X.Zhang) Krishnaraj
 Phanera hendersonii de Wit

 Phanera hypochrysa (T.C. Chen) Mackinder & R. Clark
 Phanera hypoglauca (Tang & F.T.Wang ex T.C.Chen) K.W.Jiang
 Phanera integrifolia (Roxb.) Benth.
 subsp. cumingiana (Benth.) de Wit
 var. cumingiana (Benth.) de Wit
 var. nymphaeifolia Mackinder & R. Clark
 subsp. integrifolia (Roxb.) Benth.
 Phanera involucellata (Kurz) de Wit
 Phanera japonica (Maxim.) H.Ohashi

 Phanera khasiana (Baker) Thoth.
 Phanera kingii (Prain) Bandyop., P.P. Ghoshal & M.K. Pathak

 Phanera kockiana (Korth.) Benth.
 var. angustifolia (K. Larsen & S.S. Larsen) Bandyop., P.P. Ghoshal & M.K. Pathak
 var. bakoensis (K. Larsen & S.S. Larsen) Bandyop., P.P. Ghoshal & M.K. Pathak
 var. beccarii (K. Larsen & S.S. Larsen) Bandyop., P.P. Ghoshal & M.K. Pathak
 var. brevipedicellata (K. Larsen & S.S. Larsen) Bandyop., P.P. Ghoshal & M.K. Pathak

 var. calcicola (K. Larsen & S.S. Larsen) Bandyop., P.P. Ghoshal & M.K. Pathak
 var. kockiana (Korth.) Benth.
 var. scarlatina (Cammerl.) Bandyop., P.P. Ghoshal & M.K. Pathak
 var. sericeinervia de Wit
 var. velutina de Wit
 Phanera kostermansii (K.Larsen & S.S.Larsen) Bandyop., Ghoshal & M.K.Pathak

 Phanera lambiana (Baker f.) de Wit
 Phanera laotica Mattapha & Lanors.
 Phanera larseniana Chantar., Mattapha & Wangwasit
 Phanera lingua (DC.) Miq.
 var. antipolana (Perkins) Bandyop., P.P. Ghoshal & M.K. Pathak
 var. lingua (DC.) Miq.
 var. riedelii (Baker) Bandyop., P.P. Ghoshal & M.K. Pathak

 Phanera lingyuenensis (T.C.Chen) K.W.Jiang
 Phanera longistipes (T.C.Chen) K.W.Jiang
 Phanera lucida Miq.
 Phanera lyrata (Raizada) Thoth.
 Phanera macrostachya Benth. (synonym Phanera wallichii)

 Phanera meeboldii (Craib) Thoth.
 Phanera menispermacea (Gagnep.) de Wit
 Phanera merrilliana (Perkins) de Wit
 var. borneensis (K. Larsen & S.S. Larsen) Bandyop., P.P. Ghoshal & M.K. Pathak
 var. merrilliana (Perkins) de Wit
 Phanera murthyi Vadhyar & J.H.F.Benj.

 Phanera nakhonphanomensis (Chatan) Mackinder & R. Clark
 Phanera nervosa Benth.

 Phanera ornata (Kurz) Thoth.

 Phanera pachyphylla (Merr.) de Wit
 var. pachyphylla (Merr.) de Wit
 var. wenzelii (K. Larsen & S.S. Larsen) Bandyop., P.P. Ghoshal & M.K. Pathak
 Phanera pauciflora (Merr.) de Wit
 Phanera paucinervata (T.C. Chen) Mackinder & R. Clark
 Phanera penicilliloba (Pierre ex Gagnep.) Sinou & Bruneau

 Phanera posthumi de Wit
 Phanera pottingeri (Prain) Thoth.
 Phanera praesignis (Ridl.) de Wit

 Phanera pulla (Craib) Sinou & Bruneau
 Phanera pyrrhoclada (Drake) de Wit
 Phanera pyrrhoneura (Korth.) Benth.

 Phanera ridleyi (Prain) A.Schmitz
 Phanera roxburghiana (Voigt) Bandyop., Anand Kumar & Chakrab.

 Phanera rubrovillosa (K. Larsen & S.S. Larsen) Mackinder & R. Clark (or P. rubro-villosa)

 Phanera saigonensis (Pierre ex Gagnep.) Mackinder & R. Clark
 Phanera scandens (L.) Lour. ex Raf.

 Phanera semibifida (Roxb.) Benth.
 var. acuminata (K. Larsen & S.S. Larsen) Bandyop., P.P. Ghoshal & M.K. Pathak
 var. bruneiana (K. Larsen & S.S. Larsen) Bandyop., P.P. Ghoshal & M.K. Pathak

 var. longebracteata (K. Larsen & S.S. Larsen) Bandyop., P.P. Ghoshal & M.K. Pathak
 var. perkinsiae (Roxb.) Benth.
 var. semibifida (Merr.) Bandyop., P.P.Ghoshal & M.K.Pathak
 var. stenostachya (Baker) de Wit

 Phanera siamensis (K. Larsen & S.S. Larsen) Mackinder & R. Clark
 Phanera similis (Craib) de Wit
 Phanera sirindhorniae (K. Larsen & S.S. Larsen) Mackinder & R. Clark

 Phanera stipularis (Korth.) Benth.
 var. brachystylus (K. Larsen & S.S. Larsen) Bandyop., P.P. Ghoshal & M.K. Pathak
 var. stipularis (Korth.) Benth.
 Phanera strychnoidea (Prain) Bandyop. & Ghoshal
 Phanera sulphurea (C.E.C.Fisch.) Thoth.

 Phanera steenisii (K. Larsen & S.S. Larsen) Bandyop., P.P. Ghoshal & M.K. Pathak
 Phanera sulphurea (C.E.C. Fischer) Thoth.
 Phanera sylvani de Wit

 Phanera tianlinensis (T.C. Chen & D.X. Zhang) Mackinder & R. Clark
 Phanera tubicalyx (Craib) Bandyop. & Ghoshal

 Phanera vahlii (Wight & Arn.) Benth.

 Phanera venustula (T.C.Chen) K.W.Jiang

 Phanera williamsii (F. Muell.) de Wit
 Phanera wrayi (Prain) de Wit
 var. blumeana (K. Larsen & S.S. Larsen) Bandyop., P.P. Ghoshal & M.K. Pathak
 var. borneensis (K. Larsen & S.S. Larsen) Bandyop., P.P. Ghoshal & M.K. Pathak
 var. cancellata (Ridl.) de Wit
 var. cardiophylla (Merr.) Bandyop., P.P. Ghoshal & M.K. Pathak
 var. moultonii (Merr.) Bandyop., P.P. Ghoshal & M.K. Pathak
 var. rubella de Wit
 var. wrayi (Prain) de Wit
 Phanera wuzhengyii (S.S. Larsen) Bandyop., P.P. Ghoshal & M.K. Pathak
 Phanera yunnanensis (Franch.) Wunderlin

References

External links

Cercidoideae
Fabaceae genera
Fabales of Asia